Italy competed at the 1950 European Athletics Championships in Brussels, Belgium, from 23 to 27 August 1950.

Medalists

Top eight

Men

Women

See also
 Italy national athletics team

References

External links
 EAA official site

Italy at the European Athletics Championships
Nations at the 1950 European Athletics Championships
1950 in Italian sport